= Journal of Dermatological Science =

- Discipline: Medicine
- Language: English

Publication details
- Publisher: Elsevier
- Impact factor: 5.408 (2021)

Standard abbreviations
- ISO 4: J. Dermatol. Sci.

Indexing
- ISSN: 0923-1811

Links
- Journal homepage; Online archive

Journal of Dermatological Science is a medical journal that covers the entire scope of dermatology, from molecular studies to clinical investigations. The journal is published by Elsevier.

== Abstracting and indexing ==
The journal is abstracted and indexed in:

- Science Citation Index
- Web of Science
- Embase
- BIOSIS Citation Index
- PubMed/Medline
- Abstracts on Hygiene and Communicable Diseases
- Elsevier BIOBASE

According to the Journal Citation Reports, the journal has a 2021 impact factor of 5.408.
